Julio Canessa (born 23 March 1958 in Uruguay) is a Uruguayan retired footballer.

Personal life
Canessa was married to Mexican singer Lupita D'Alessio from 1984 to 1985.

References

Uruguayan footballers
Living people
1958 births
Club León footballers
Association footballers not categorized by position